Andy Ibáñez Velázquez (born April 3, 1993) is a Cuban professional baseball infielder in the Detroit Tigers organization. He made his Major League Baseball (MLB) debut in 2021 for the Texas Rangers.

Career
Ibáñez played for the Cuba national baseball team at the 2013 World Baseball Classic. He played for Isla de la Juventud in the Cuban National Series. He defected from Cuba on November 1, 2014, to pursue a career in Major League Baseball. He signed a minor league deal with the Texas Rangers on July 7, 2015.

Texas Rangers
Ibáñez made his professional debut in 2016, spending time with both the Hickory Crawdads and Frisco RoughRiders, batting a combined .285 with 13 home runs, 66 RBIs, 15 stolen bases and an .804 OPS in 130 total games between the two clubs. In 2017, he returned to Frisco and spent the whole season there, slashing .265/.323/400 with eight home runs and 29 RBIs in 82 games. He missed six weeks of the season due to a finger injury. Ibáñez spent the 2018 season with the Round Rock Express of the Triple-A Pacific Coast League. He posted a batting line of .283/.344/.410/.754 with 12 home runs and 55 RBI in 125 games. Ibáñez played for the Aguilas Cibaenas of the Dominican Winter League in the 2018 offseason.	
Ibáñez received a non-roster invitation to 2019 major league spring training. In 2019, Ibáñez suffered a strained right oblique during spring training, and returned on April 6, when he was assigned to the Nashville Sounds. He spent the 2019 season with Nashville, hitting .300/.371/.497/.868 with 20 home runs and 65 RBI. Ibáñez did not play in 2020 due to the cancellation of the Minor League Baseball season because of the COVID-19 pandemic.

On May 4, 2021, the Rangers selected Ibáñez’s contract to the 40-man roster and promoted him to the major leagues for the first time. Ibáñez made his debut that day as a pinch hitter for David Dahl, and collected his first MLB hit off of Minnesota Twins reliever Taylor Rogers. On June 21, Ibáñez recorded his first career home run, a 3-run shot off of Oakland Athletics starter Frankie Montas. Over 76 games for Texas in 2021, Ibáñez hit .277/.321/.435/.756 with 7 home runs and 25 RBI. Ibáñez split the 2022 season between Texas and Round Rock. Over 40 games for Texas he hit .219/.273/.277/.551 with 1 home run and 9 RBI; with Round Rock he hit .255/.330/.390/.720 with 6 home runs and 31 RBI.

Detroit Tigers
On November 10, 2022, Ibáñez was claimed off waivers by the Detroit Tigers. On January 6, 2023, Ibáñez was removed from the 40-man roster and sent outright to the Triple-A Toledo Mud Hens.

See also
List of baseball players who defected from Cuba

References

External links

1993 births
Living people
Baseball players from Havana
Major League Baseball players from Cuba
Cuban expatriate baseball players in the United States
Major League Baseball infielders
Texas Rangers players
Toronjeros de Isla de la Juventud players
Hickory Crawdads players
Surprise Saguaros players
Frisco RoughRiders players
Round Rock Express players
Águilas Cibaeñas players
Cuban expatriate baseball players in the Dominican Republic
Nashville Sounds players
2013 World Baseball Classic players